Sen Morimoto is a Japanese jazz rap  multi-instrumentalist. Born in Kyoto, Morimoto is from  western Massachusetts, and currently lives  in Chicago.  Morimoto has released two albums. His first album, Cannonball! was released in 2018. Morimoto released his self-titled second album in 2021.

In addition to releasing his own music, Morimoto has collaborated with KAINA, Nnamdi Ogbonnaya, and Lala Lala.

References

Japanese jazz musicians
Musicians from Kyoto
Living people
21st-century Japanese musicians
Year of birth missing (living people)